Parkland Memorial Hospital is a public hospital in Dallas, Texas, United States.  It is the main hospital of the Parkland Health & Hospital System and serves as Dallas County's public hospital. It is located within the Southwestern Medical District. The hospital is staffed by the faculty, residents, and medical students of UT Southwestern Medical Center.

History

The original hospital opened on May 19, 1894, in a wooden building on a  meadow located at Oak Lawn Avenue and Maple. The name Parkland came from the land on which the hospital was built, originally purchased by the city as a park. A brick building (the first hospital brick building erected in Texas, now owned by Crow Holdings) replaced the wooden facility in 1913.

In 1954, Parkland moved to 5201 Harry Hines Boulevard about a mile from its original site. It's renal dialysis unit opened in 1955, burns unit in 1961, and cardiac intensive care unit in 1969. All services from the campus at Maple Avenue were decommissioned in 1974. The new Parkland tower blocks were redeveloped in 1981, and the triangular wing at the hospital's entrance on Harry Hines Boulevard opened in the late 1980s.

On August 20, 2015, Parkland opened a new emergency department and began accepting patients. Construction commenced in 2010. Staff members and patients were transferred throughout the next few days, from 5201 Harry Hines Boulevard to the new hospital located across the street at 5200 Harry Hines Boulevard. The new hospital welcomed its first birth, a boy delivered by Caesarean section, that same morning.

The former hospital site on 5201 Harry Hines Boulevard is set for demolition in 2022-23, after closing on July 11, 2022.

John F. Kennedy assassination

Parkland Hospital is best known as the hospital where five individuals associated with the assassination of United States President John F. Kennedy either died or were pronounced dead: President Kennedy himself; his assassin Lee Harvey Oswald; Jack Ruby who later killed Oswald; Abraham Zapruder, who had filmed Kennedy's assassination; and Jean Hill, another witness to the assassination (the "Lady in Red" seen in the Zapruder film). The 2013 film Parkland dramatizes the deaths of Kennedy and Oswald in the hospital.

After he was shot on November 22, 1963, President Kennedy was rushed to Parkland, where he was pronounced dead at 1:00 p.m. in Trauma Room 1, 30 minutes after he was shot at Dealey Plaza. At the same time, Texas governor John Connally, wounded in the same shooting, was treated in Trauma Room 2, and survived. Two days after the assassination, November 24, Oswald was rushed to Parkland after being shot in the abdomen by Ruby and died in operating room #5 after over 90 minutes of surgery. Ruby died on January 3, 1967, in the same emergency department, from a pulmonary embolism associated with lung cancer. Then, on August 30, 1970, Zapruder also died at Parkland.

Since Ruby's death in 1967, areas where Kennedy was pronounced dead and Oswald was operated on have been remodeled. A plaque there marks the location where Trauma Room 1 was previously in the prior Parkland, now a corridor in the hospital's radiology department. The ambulance entry remained in roughly the same location. The site of Trauma Room 1 has been renovated several times since 1963. Trauma Room 1 was dismantled for renovation in 1973; all building materials and equipment from the room were retained by the government and remain in archival storage today. Parkland's JFK history wall is noted at the new hospital.

Awards and recognition
Parkland has been recognized as one of the nation's Most Wired™ Hospitals for excellence in using technology to fill gaps in care, provide services 24 hours a day, 7 days a week, and expand access to medical specialists. The hospital received this recognition 2014–2017.

Parkland was awarded The Joint Commission's Gold Seal of Approval® and the American Heart Association/American Stroke Association's Heart-Check mark in 2017 for Advanced Certification for Comprehensive Stroke Centers.

In 2017, Parkland Health & Hospital System was recognized as a Top Performer in LGBT Healthcare Equality by the Human Rights Campaign (HRC) Foundation, the educational arm of the country's largest lesbian, gay, bisexual and transgender (LGBT) civil rights organization. Parkland earned top marks in meeting non-discrimination and training criteria that demonstrate its commitment to equitable, inclusive care for LGBT patients and their families.

Leadership
In May 2017, Fred Cerise, MD, MPH, president and CEO of Parkland Health & Hospital System was appointed by the U.S. Comptroller General to the Medicaid and CHIP Payment and Access Commission (MACPAC). As a member of the commission, Dr. Cerise serves as a national advisor to Congress on issues affecting Medicaid and CHIP.

Parkland Trauma Department
In 2016, the staff of Parkland's Rees-Jones Trauma Center began an initiative to teach classes to the community members so that they can learn how to recognize life-threatening bleeding and administer appropriate medical treatment before professional rescuers arrive. Parkland "Stop the Bleed" classes have been adapted from courses including the U.S. Military's Tactical combat Casualty Care Guidelines and the Prehospital trauma Life Support (PHTLS) course and a part of a large, United States Government effort to make "Stop the Bleed" training the CPR of the 21st century.

The staff of Parkland Memorial Hospital's Emergency Department and Rees-Jones Trauma Center received the 2016 Texas Preparedness Leadership Award for "Outstanding Service in Response to the 2016 Dallas Police Shootings." The award was presented at the 2016 Preparedness Coalition Symposium held Oct. 12–14 in Galveston.

Capabilities
Parkland is the Dallas County public hospital; funds are primarily provided by a specially designated property tax on Dallas County residents.

Parkland serves as one of Dallas's four Level I Trauma Centers (alongside Baylor University Medical Center, Methodist Dallas Medical Center, Children's Medical Center), a primary care center for Dallas County residents, and (along with UT Southwestern) as a medical and surgical referral center for North Texas and parts of Southern Oklahoma. Thus, virtually all medical and surgical subspecialties are represented—which makes Parkland a destination for post-graduate medical training. The Parkland Burn Center, one of the largest civilian burn units in the U.S., is famous for the Parkland Formula for fluid resuscitation, developed by Charles R. Baxter in the 1960s. The fame of the Parkland formula is due to its being one of the first treatments for burn that included rehydration and electrolytic management.

Parkland ranks among the largest teaching hospitals in the nation. Texas Woman's University began its Bachelor of Science nursing program at Parkland in 1954 and it is still located within walking distance of the Parkland campus. Parkland also serves as the major teaching hospital of the adjacent University of Texas Southwestern Medical Center.

It has the distinction of delivering more infants under one roof than any other hospital in the nation, averaging 15–16,000 deliveries per year.  Parkland Memorial has eleven prenatal clinics and employs 72 doctors training to become obstetricians-gynecologists and 45 nurse-midwives. In 2005, the staff delivered 15,590 babies, an average of more than 42 infants per day. Parkland created one of the first high-risk antenatal units in the nation and had the first neonatal intensive care unit in North Texas.

Parkland has approximately 240,000 emergency visits a year, for the co-located main emergency department (153,915 visits in 2013), and the urgent care unit (60,013 visits in 2013).

Parkland is also the base for Biotel, the medical direction system used by Dallas Fire-Rescue as well as fourteen other emergency medical service agencies in the Metroplex.

New Parkland Hospital
Parkland's high volume of patients led to the decision by the Dallas County Commissioners Court to propose replacing the overcrowded, 50+-year-old building with a new , 17-story, 862-bed facility, along with a new  outpatient center, a  office facility, and parking for 6,000 cars. The total cost would be $1.27 billion, to be paid for through three avenues: 1) a $747 million bond proposition (contingent on voter approval, which was obtained in November 2008), 2) $350 million of cash from current and future operations, and 3) $150 million from private donations.

The board approved nearly $100 million in contracts and hired two architectural firms – HDR, Inc. (based in Omaha, Nebraska, but operates a large practice in Dallas) and Corgan Associates Inc. (based in Dallas) – to design the new building. (A parking garage was completed as a design/build project by Whiting-Turner Construction and the architecture firm of Omniplan in January 2012.) One major feature of the new facility is that movements of staff and supplies are handled in separate corridors and elevators from those used by patients and visitors.

The formal groundbreaking ceremony was held in October 2010; the facility was officially dedicated in March 2015, with all patients and staff officially occupying the facility that August. The new facility is immediately across Harry Hines Boulevard from the former hospital complex, and is served by the Southwestern Medical District/Parkland station of DART light rail, which opened in December 2010.
 In addition to Dallas County taxpayers funding the public hospital, large private donations were made as well, over the next five years; one major donation of $1 million was made by the Bank of America Charitable Foundation. Donors have their names permanently etched in glass panels in the two-story, glass atrium main lobby.

Hatcher Station Health Center
In May, 2014,  a new 44,300-square-foot, Parkland Health & Hospital System-affiliated outpatient clinic near Fair Park began construction on a 7-acre site adjacent to DART's Hatcher Station. The $19.8 million clinic, which was designed by BOKA Powell for Frazier Revitalization Inc. and Parkland Health & Hospital System, serves geriatric and behavioral health patients, along with adults, women, children, and infants. It also provides on-site diagnostic imaging and lab services. Exam rooms feature flexible equipment setups, and an on-site conference facility accommodates education and wellness programs. The clinic, officially named Hatcher Station Health Center, opened on May 19, 2015.

See also
List of hospitals in Texas
National Register of Historic Places listings in Dallas County, Texas
List of Dallas Landmarks

References

External links

Parkland Memorial Hospital Official Site
New Parkland Hospital Official Site
Parkland Formula Formula  created by Dr. Baxter of Parkland Hospital

Hospitals in Dallas
Southwestern Medical District
Buildings and structures associated with the assassination of John F. Kennedy
Teaching hospitals in Texas
University of Texas System
Hospitals established in 1894
Texas Woman's University
National Register of Historic Places in Dallas
Hospital buildings completed in 1894
Hospital buildings completed in 1913
Hospital buildings completed in 1954
1894 establishments in Texas
Hospital buildings completed in 2015
Trauma centers
Public hospitals in the United States